Sam Weisman is an American film director. He has directed the films D2: The Mighty Ducks, Bye Bye Love, George of the Jungle, The Out-of-Towners, What's the Worst That Could Happen?, and Dickie Roberts: Former Child Star. Weisman is a 1973 graduate of Brandeis University's MFA program in Acting and Directing. He earned a BA in Music History from Yale University, where he was a member of the second longest running a cappella group in the nation, The Society of Orpheus and Bacchus.

His brother was the film producer David Weisman.

Sam Weisman is married to former Knots Landing actress Constance McCashin, with whom he has two children: Marguerite Weisman, an editorial assistant an editor at Penguin Random House, and Daniel Weisman, formerly a music manager, who managed Capital Cities, Wale and Mike Posner, now in wealth management.

Filmography
 Dickie Roberts: Former Child Star (2003)
 What's the Worst That Could Happen? (2001)
The Out-of-Towners (1999) 
 George of the Jungle (1997)
 Bye Bye Love (1995)
 D2: The Mighty Ducks (1994)
 Mimi & Me (1991)
 The Art of Being Nick (1986)
Taking It Home (1986)

References

External links 

American film directors
1947 births
American television directors
Comedy film directors
Living people
Brandeis University alumni
Yale School of Music alumni